Naniz may refer to:
 Naniz-e Olya
 Naniz-e Sofla